Régis Fuchs (born April 6, 1970, in Porrentruy,  Switzerland) is a Swiss professional ice hockey winger.

Achievements
1997 - NLA Champion with SC Bern
1999 - NLA Champion with HC Lugano
2003 - NLA Champion with HC Lugano
2006 - NLA Champion with HC Lugano

Records
Régis Fuchs is the only player to have participated in 8 NLA  playoff final series.

International play
Régis Fuchs played a total of 22 games for Swiss national team.

Family
Fuchs has two sons who are currently playing hockey in La Chaux-de-Fonds, Switzerland: Jason (born September 14, 1995) plays in the National League B; and Robin (born June 14, 1997) plays at the Elite Novizen level.

References

External links

Fuchs on hockeyfans.ch

Living people
1970 births
Swiss ice hockey forwards
SC Bern players
EHC Biel players
HC Ajoie players
HC La Chaux-de-Fonds players
HC Lugano players
HC Martigny players
People from Porrentruy
Sportspeople from the canton of Jura